Jana Kirschner (born Jana Kirschnerová; 29 December 1978 in Martin) is a Slovak singer, songwriter and multiple award winner across several music genres.

In 1996 she released her first album Jana Kirschner, however, it was her second record V cudzom meste which brought Jana Kirschner widespread recognition and popularity in Slovakia and later in the Czech Republic. She won four ZAI Awards including the New Artist of the Year (1997), Album and Music Artist of the Year respectively (1999), and Female Singer of the Year (2000). In 1999, she topped the local Slávik poll–based awards. In the years 2003 and 2007, she won two Aurel Awards as Female Singer of the Year.

In 2013 and 2014, Jana Kirschner released a two-album project titled Moruša: Biela and Moruša: Čierna produced by British musician, composer and arranger Eddie Stevens.The tracks from both albums were brought to life again in 2015 on the album Moruša: Remixed which contains 12 songs remixed by various producers from Central Europe.

Discography 
 Jana Kirschner (1997)
 V cudzom meste (1999)
 Pelikán (2002)
 Veci čo sa dejú (2003)
 Shine (2007)
 Krajina rovina (2010)
 Moruša: Biela (2013)
 Moruša: Čierna (2014)
 Moruša: Remixed (2015)
Živá (2017)

Other appearances
2006: Strážce plamene with Petr Hapka & Michal Horáček
2007: Strážce plamene v obrazech with Hapka & Horáček
collaborations with many artists : Miroslav Žbirka, Lenka Filipová, Ivan Tásler, Robert Kodym, Jelen, Tomáš Klus, Korben Dallas, Vojtěch Dyk, Jaromír Nohavica, Lucie Bílá, Para, Peter Lipa and others

Personal life 
She lives in London together with her husband, British producer Eddie Stevens, and two children.

See also
 The 100 Greatest Slovak Albums of All Time

References

External links
Official website 
Review of Krajina Rovina (in English)

1978 births
Living people
People from Martin, Slovakia
21st-century Slovak women singers
20th-century Slovak women singers